Schaken is a surname. Notable people with the surname include:

Ruben Schaken (born 1982), Dutch footballer 
Gregory Schaken (born 1989), Dutch footballer

See also
Chess - alternate language